Insidious is the fifth album by the melodic death metal band Nightrage. The album was released on 26 September in Europe and a day later in North America (27 September) through German label, Lifeforce Records. The Japanese version of the album includes a cover of Def Leppard's "Photograph".

The song Wrapped In Deceitful Dreams references in the lyrics "Seas Of Eternal Silence" which may refer to the Sweet Vengeance song At The Ends Of The Earth or the 1997 Exhumation (Marios Iliopoulos' former band) album by the same name.

Insidious is the first Nightrage album in the band's history to feature the same line up as the previous album.

Track listing

Musical appearances
 On 22 March 2012 the title track Insidious was made available as downloadable content for Rock Band 3 on Xbox 360 through Rock Band Network.
 On 26 April 2012, Wrapped In Deceitful Dreams was made available as downloadable content for Rock Band 3 on Xbox 360 through Rock Band Network.
 On 21 June 2012, So Far Away / Delirium Of The Fallen was made available as downloadable content for Rock Band 3 on Xbox 360 through Rock Band Network.

Personnel
Nightrage
 Antony Hämäläinen – Vocals, Lyrics
 Marios Iliopoulos – Guitar, Music composition, Lyrics
 Olof Mörck – Guitar, Music composition
 Anders Hammer – Bass guitar
 Johan Nunez – Drums

Guest musicians
 Tomas Lindberg - guest vocals on "Insidious", "Sham Piety", and "This World Is Coming To An End"
 Gus G. – guitar solos on "Wrapped In Deceitful Dreams" and "Solar Corona"
 Tom S. Englund - clean vocals on "Wrapped In Deceitful Dreams" and "Solar Corona"
 Apollo Papathanasio - clean vocals on "Delirium Of The Fallen", "This World Is Coming To An End", and "Photograph"
 Elias Holmlid - Strings and piano on "Delirium Of The Fallen"
 John K - Orchestrations and keyboards on "Solar Eclipse" and "Emblem Of Light"
 George Baharidis - Orchestrations on "So Far Away" and  "Solar Corona"

Production
 Fredrik Nordström – Mixing, Mastering at Studio Fredman
 Henrik Udd – Mixing, Editing at Studio Fredman
 Ryan Butler - Vocal recordings at Arcane Digital Recordings
 Terry Nikas - Drums, Guitar, Bass recordings at Zero Gravity Studios

References

Nightrage albums
2011 albums
Lifeforce Records albums